Orville Adalbert Derby (July 23, 1851 – November 27, 1915) was an American geologist who worked in Brazil.

Education

Derby studied geology at the Cornell University, obtaining his degree in 1873. While a student, he was invited in 1870 by his professor Charles Frederick Hartt (1840–1878)  to follow him in a study travel to Brazil (the Morgan Expedition), and returning again with him in 1871, this time going to the Tapajós River in the Amazon. Just after his graduation, Derby accepted a post of assistant professor at Cornell and briefly substituted for Hartt during another travel to Brazil in 1874. In June of the same year, Derby defended his doctoral thesis on the carboniferous brachiopoda in the Amazon.

Brazil
When Hartt organized the first Geological Commission of the Empire of Brazil, Derby was nominated its assistant and returned to Brazil in December 1875. In 1877, with the end of the Commission, Derby decided to stay in Brazil and accepted a post at the National Museum of Rio de Janeiro. He became also a member and director of the Geographic and Geological Commission of São Paulo from 1886 to 1904. This commission later originated the Astronomical and Geophysical Institute of the University of São Paulo. Derby founded also the first Botanical Gardens in São Paulo ("Horto Botânico"). In 1906 he was nominated to the Brazilian Geographic and Geological Survey. 

Derby worked in many domains of the geological sciences, such as mineralogy, economic geology, physical geography, cartography, petrography, meteorology, archeology and paleontology.

Publications
He published 173 papers on the geology of Brazil from 1873 to 1915. He was also the publisher of one of the first geological maps of Brazil, in 1915.

Personal life and death
Dr. Orville Derby never married and led a solitary existence, living mostly in hotel rooms. After the failure of an invitation by the state government of Bahia, he returned to Rio de Janeiro and committed suicide in a hotel room, on November 27, 1915, a few months after gaining Brazilian citizenship. He was 64 years old.

References

Further reading

 Diniz Gonsalves, A., 1952 – Orville A. Derby's Studies on the Paleontology of Brazil – Published under the direction of the Executive Commission for the 1st Centenary Commemorating the birth of Orville A. Derby, and sponsored by the American Embassy in Brazil.  Rio de Janeiro, 1952.

1851 births
1915 suicides
Brazilian people of American descent
American geologists
Brazilian geologists
Cornell University College of Agriculture and Life Sciences alumni
Suicides in Brazil
American emigrants to Brazil
People from Cayuga County, New York